Vasanthakala Paravai is a 1991 Indian Tamil-language romantic drama film written and directed by Pavithran in his debut. The film stars Ramesh Aravind, Sarathkumar and Shali. The film, produced by K. T. Kunjumon and scored by Deva, was released on 19 September 1991. Deva won the Cinema Express Award for Best Music Director.

Plot 

Ravi, a shopkeeper, falls in love with Uma, a student, who belongs to a rich family. But their relationship is tested when Uma's brother Rajesh decides to intervene and break their bond. They both elope and escape to Chennai and get married. Their family arrive there to separate the couple on the pretext of accepting them. Uma's parents drag her to them and Rajesh successfully gets in Ravi arrested under the false case of kidnapping Uma. Looking at the events, Uma's grandfather commits suicide in despair. Uma escapes from her home to save Ravi. The cop who is initially tortures Ravi later has a change of heart and helps the lovers. Rajesh arrives there to bring his sister. Uma files a false case against her brother for behaving inappropriately with her. Uma later admits that she did this to teach her brother a lesson for separating her from her husband. Pair gets united.

Cast 
 Ramesh Aravind as Ravi
 Sarathkumar as Rajesh
 Shali as Uma
 Goundamani as Ravi's friend's uncle
 V. K. Ramasamy as Uma's grandfather
 Sathyapriya as Uma's mother
 Major Sundarrajan as the Judge
 Charle as Ravi's friend
 Kitty as Uma's uncle
 K. K. Soundar as Ravi's uncle
 C. R. Saraswathi as Uma's lawyer
 Rajan P. Dev as the Inspector
Prabhu Deva as a dancer

Production 
Vasanthakala Paravai was the directorial debut of Pavithran, and the first Tamil film produced by K. T. Kunjumon.<ref>{{Cite web |last=சனா |date=31 Jul 2018 |title=எல்லோருக்கும் உதவினேன்; எனக்கு யாரும் உதவலை!" – கே.டி.குஞ்சுமோன் 'அப்போ இப்போ' பகுதி 19 |url=https://cinema.vikatan.com/tamil-cinema/132531-producer-k-t-kunjumon-speaks-about-his-career-in-appo-ippo-series |url-status=live |archive-url=https://web.archive.org/web/20210909063700/https://cinema.vikatan.com/tamil-cinema/132531-producer-k-t-kunjumon-speaks-about-his-career-in-appo-ippo-series |archive-date=9 September 2021 |access-date=9 September 2021 |website=Ananda Vikatan |language=ta}}</ref>

 Soundtrack 
The music was composed by Deva, and the lyrics were written by Vaali.

 Release and reception Vasanthakala Paravai was released on 19 September 1991. Sundarji of Kalki'' called it an ordinary love story, but appreciated some of the dialogues. Deva won the Cinema Express Award for Best Music Director.

References

External links 
 

1990s Tamil-language films
1991 directorial debut films
1991 films
1991 romantic drama films
Films scored by Deva (composer)
Indian romantic drama films